Kenan Muslimović (born 13 February 1997) is an Austrian and Bosnian professional footballer who plays as a forward for German amateur club DJK Ammerthal.

Career
Born in Vienna, he started playing in the youth teams of Austrian clubs FK Austria Wien and FC Admira Wacker. In the summer 2014, he joined the senior team of First Vienna FC, however, he played for the B team.

Following summer, in 2015, he moved to Italy and signed for the youth team of Novara Calcio During the first-half of the season, making three appearances in the youth league. Novara won the race with FC Red Bull Salzburg in signing him.

During the winter-break of the 2015–16 season, he left Italy and moved to former-Yugoslavia to join Bosnian side FK Mladost Doboj Kakanj. playing in the Premier League of Bosnia and Herzegovina. Regarded as a major talent, in summer 2016 he moved to Serbia. Initially, he was about to join FK Partizan's farm-club FK Teleoptik, thus following a family tradition, since his father, who had ended his career prematurely because of illness, had played for the Partizan youth team. However, instead, he ended up joining top-league side FK Novi Pazar.

He failed to debut in the SuperLiga during the first half of the 2016–17 season. In December 2016 and January 2017, he was on trials at German club Hertha BSC. He ended up staying at Novi Pazar, and made his debut in the Serbian SuperLiga on 18 February 2017, in the first round played after winter-break. In August 2017, he left Novi Pazar.

Between Summer 2017 and January 2019, Muslimović played in Germany for the second teams of 1. FC Kaiserslautern and SSV Jahn Regensburg.

On 25 January 2019, he came back and signed with Mladost Doboj Kakanj in the Premier League of Bosnia and Herzegovina. After half a season, on 9 June 2019, Muslimović left Mladost.

Ahead of the 2019-20 season, Muslimović returned to Germany and joined FC Pipinsried. After a spell in Bulgaria, he moved back to Germany once more to play for SV Donaustauf.

Personal life
Kenan is the nephew of Bosnian singer Halid Muslimović.

Honours
Lokomotiv Plovdiv
 Bulgarian Cup: 2019–20
 Bulgarian Supercup: 2020

References

External links
Kenan Muslimović at Sofascore

1997 births
Living people
Footballers from Vienna
Austrian footballers
Bosnia and Herzegovina footballers
Association football forwards
First Vienna FC players
FK Mladost Doboj Kakanj players
FK Novi Pazar players
1. FC Kaiserslautern II players
SSV Jahn Regensburg II players
FC Pipinsried players
PFC Lokomotiv Plovdiv players
Austrian 2. Landesliga players
Premier League of Bosnia and Herzegovina players
Serbian SuperLiga players
Bayernliga players
First Professional Football League (Bulgaria) players
Austrian expatriate footballers
Expatriate footballers in Serbia
Austrian expatriate sportspeople in Serbia
Expatriate footballers in Germany
Austrian expatriate sportspeople in Germany
Expatriate footballers in Bulgaria
Austrian expatriate sportspeople in Bulgaria